WASP-45 is a K-type main-sequence star about 690 light-years away. The star age cannot be well constrained, but it is probably older than Sun. Yet, WASP-45 is enriched in heavy elements compared to Sun, having 240% of solar abundance.

The star has low ultraviolet emission, therefore suspected to have a low starspot activity, although chromospheric activity was reported elsewhere.

Planetary system
In 2011 a transiting hot Jupiter planet b  was detected. No Rayleigh scattering was detected in planetary atmosphere, implying existence of hazes or high cloud deck.

References

Sculptor (constellation)
K-type main-sequence stars
Planetary systems with one confirmed planet
Planetary transit variables
J00205699-3559537